Megadromus is a genus of beetles in the family Carabidae, containing the following species:

 Megadromus alternus (Broun, 1886)
 Megadromus antarcticus (Chaudoir, 1865)
 Megadromus asperatus (Broun, 1886)
 Megadromus bucolicus (Broun, 1903)
 Megadromus bullatus (Broun, 1915)
 Megadromus capito (White, 1846)
 Megadromus compressus (Sharp, 1886)
 Megadromus curtulus (Broun, 1884)
 Megadromus enysi (Broun, 1882)
 Megadromus fultoni (Broun, 1882)
 Megadromus guerinii (Chaudoir, 1865)
 Megadromus haplopus (Broun, 1893)
 Megadromus lobipes (Bates, 1878)
 Megadromus memes (Broun, 1903)
 Megadromus meritus (Broun, 1884)
 Megadromus rectalis (Broun, 1881)
 Megadromus rectangulus (Chaudoir, 1865)
 Megadromus sandageri (Broun, 1893)
 Megadromus temukensis (Bates, 1878)
 Megadromus turgidiceps (Broun, 1908)
 Megadromus vagans (Broun, 1886)
 Megadromus vigil (White, 1846)
 Megadromus virens (Broun, 1886)
 Megadromus wallacei (Broun, 1912)

References

Pterostichinae
Carabidae genera